Victoria Hopper (24 May 1909 – 22 January 2007) was a Canadian-born British stage and film actress and singer.

Biography
Victoria Evelyn Hopper was born in Vancouver, British Columbia, Canada and brought up in North East England. She studied acting and singing at the Webber-Douglas School of Singing, and was talent spotted in a school production and cast in the title role in a West End play, Martine in 1933. She was at the peak of her popularity during the 1930s. She was married from August 1934 until 1939 to Basil Dean, a British stage and film writer, director and producer. Dean reportedly grew interested in Hooper due to her resemblance to a former lover of his, actress Meggie Albanesi (died 1923).

Dean promoted Hopper's career and cast her as the leading lady in several major films for Associated Talking Pictures in the mid-1930s. However, the films did badly at the box office and her career waned. Two films she was scheduled to appear in, Grace Darling and Come Live with Me, never materialised.

Filmography
 The Constant Nymph (1933) as Tess Sanger
 Lorna Doone (1934) as Lorna Doone
 Whom the Gods Love (1936) as Constanze Mozart
 Lonely Road (released in the US as Scotland Yard Commands) (1936) as Molly Gordon
 Laburnum Grove (1936) as Elsie Radfern
 The Mill on the Floss (1937) as Lucy Deane
 The Constant Nymph (1938, TV film) as Tessa Sanger
 Nine Till Six (1938, TV film)
 Cornelius (1938, TV film)
 London Wall (1938, TV film) as Pat Milligan
 Magic (1939, TV film) as Patricia Carleon
 The Rose Without a Thorn (1947, TV film)
 Escape from Broadmoor (1948)

Theatre roles
 Three Sisters (1934) as Mary (Theatre Royal Drury Lane, London) (from 30 April)
 Cornelius (1935) as Judy Evison (Duchess Theatre, Aldwych, London) (from 8 April)
 The Melody That Got Lost (1936) as Edith (Embassy Theatre, Swiss Cottage, London) (26 December)
 Autumn (1937) as Monica Brooke (St. Martin's Theatre, London) 
 Autumn (1938) as Monica Brooke (Touring production, Leeds - 19 May for one week)
 Drawing Room (1938) as Sylvia (Touring production) (Theatre Royal, Brighton, 19 June for one week)
Johnson Over Jordan (1939) as Freda Johnson (Saville Theatre, London)
 The Dominant Sex (1941) as Angela Shale (Touring production?) (Theatre Royal, Hanley, from 2 March)
 The Shop on Sly Corner (1945) as Margaret Heiss (St. Martin's Theatre, London) 
 Vanity Fair (1946) as Amelia Sedley (Comedy Theatre, London) (29 October 1946 - 21 December 1946)
 Once Upon a Crime (1948) (Theatre Royal Birmingham) (Commenced Monday, 21 June)
 Serious Charge (1955) as Hester Byfield (Garrick Theatre, London) (From 17 February)

Bibliography
 Sweet, Matthew. Shepperton Babylon: The Lost Worlds of British Cinema, Faber and Faber (16 February 2006); /

References

Sources
Obituary: Victoria Hopper, independent.co.uk; 3 February 2007.

External links
 
 Victoria Hopper website

1909 births
2007 deaths
Actresses from Vancouver
Canadian emigrants to the United Kingdom
Canadian musical theatre actresses
Canadian film actresses
Canadian stage actresses
Canadian television actresses
English musical theatre actresses
English film actresses
English stage actresses
English television actresses
Musicians from Vancouver
Actors from Gateshead
Actresses from Tyne and Wear
Musicians from Tyne and Wear
20th-century English women singers
20th-century English singers
20th-century Canadian women singers